Ai Zhibo (born 29 October 1982) is a Chinese football player who currently plays as a defender.

Club career
Ai Zhibo played for Wuhan Hongjinlong for several seasons after graduating from their youth system in the 2001 league season. During his time at Wuhan he was often used as a squad player within the team, however despite this he was able to play his part in the team's promotion in winning the second tier league title in 2004. The following season would see him play his part in helping the team establish themselves within the Chinese Super League by aiding them to a fifth-place finish. After several seasons within the top tier Wuhan had a difficult 2008 season which saw them relegated and then controversially dissolved as a football club.

Without a football club, Ai Zhibo would be allowed to leave for Changchun Yatai at the beginning of the 2009 Chinese Super League season. He would go on to make his club debut on March 28, 2009 against Jiangsu Sainty F.C. in a 1-0 victory coming on as a late substitute. Once again Ai Zhibo was used as a squad player within the team and only made four appearances within his debut season. Things at Changchun did not improve the following season especially with the introduction of Shen Xiangfu coming in as manager who dropped him from the first team. Ai Zhibo would have to wait during the 2010 summer transfer before another top tier side Jiangsu Sainty took him on loan and reunited him with his former manager at Wuhan, Pei Encai.

On 15 July 2014, Ai transferred to China League One side Wuhan Zall, a team formed as a Phoenix club to Wuhan Hongjinlong. While Ai joined the club halfway through the season he quickly established himself as a vital member of the team and saw the club miss out on promotion to the Chinese Super League on goal difference. After several seasons with the club Ai was finally able to win promotion with the club when Wuhan Zall won to the 2018 China League One division.

Career statistics 
Statistics accurate as of match played 31 December 2020.

Honours

Club
Wuhan Hongjinlong
China League One: 2004

Jiangsu Sainty
Chinese FA Super Cup: 2013

Wuhan Zall
China League One: 2018

References

External links
Player profile at Sina.com
Player stats at Sohu.com
 

1982 births
Living people
Chinese footballers
Footballers from Wuhan
Wuhan Guanggu players
Changchun Yatai F.C. players
Jiangsu F.C. players
Wuhan F.C. players
Chinese Super League players
China League One players
Association football defenders